Réveil Club de Daloa (RC Daloa) is an Ivorian football club based in Daloa. As a member of the Ivorian Football Federation Premiere Division, RC Daloa plays at the Stade Municipal.

The club colours are green and yellow. The team won the cup in 1980 and were runners-up in 1960.

Current squad

Achievements
Côte d'Ivoire Cup: 1
1980

Performance in CAF competitions
CAF Cup Winners' Cup: 1 appearance
1981 – First Round

Football clubs in Ivory Coast
1932 establishments in Ivory Coast
Sport in Sassandra-Marahoué District
Daloa
Association football clubs established in 1932